Bolesławek  is a village in the administrative district of Gmina Żabia Wola, within Grodzisk Mazowiecki County, Masovian Voivodeship, in east-central Poland.  During World War II, it was extensively bombed by the German Luftwaffe, then torched in reprisal for resistance activity.  Most of the inhabitants were killed or deported.

References

Villages in Grodzisk Mazowiecki County